The Fabergé Museum in Saint Petersburg is a privately owned museum in Saint Petersburg, Russia. It was established by Viktor Vekselberg and his Link of Times foundation in order to repatriate lost cultural valuables to Russia. The museum is located in central Saint Petersburg at the Naryshkin-Shuvalov Palace (21, Fontanka River Embankment) on the Fontanka River. The museum's collection contains more than 4,000 works of decorative applied and fine arts, including gold and silver items, paintings, porcelain and bronze. A highlight of the museum's collection is the group of nine Imperial Easter eggs created by Fabergé for the last two Russian Tsars.

History 
The idea of creating a special museum devoted to the creative work of the great Russian jeweler Peter Carl Fabergé came to the Link of Times foundation after the purchase by Viktor Vekselberg in 2004 of a unique collection of Fabergé masterpieces that had been owned by the late Malcolm Forbes. Since then, the Link of Times foundation began building a collection of Russian decorative applied and fine arts, which contains more than 4,000 works. All of the Imperial Easter eggs in the museum's collection are connected to the rule and personal life of the last two Russian emperors: Alexander III and Nicolas II.

The Link of Times foundation began restoring the 18th-century Naryshkin-Shuvalov Palace (which is rented by the foundation) in St. Petersburg in 2006, with the goal of opening the museum in the palace. A significant amount of work was done over seven years to recreate the historical appearance of the palace. This was the first full-fledged restoration of the palace in its entire 200-year history. The official opening ceremony of the Fabergé Museum took place on 19 November 2013.

The collection 
The Fabergé Museum's collection has nine Imperial Easter eggs that were made to the order of the last two Romanov Tsars. The eggs were bought by Vekselberg in 2004 from the family of the American newspaper magnate Malcolm Forbes. He purchased them just before they came up for auction, paying $100 million for the Forbes family's entire Fabergé collection.

In total, there are fifteen Fabergé eggs in the Blue Room of Naryshkin-Shuvalov Palace, as well as a miniature picture frame in the form of a heart – the surprise from the lost Mauve egg of 1897.

List of Imperial Easter eggs
First Hen egg
Renaissance egg
Rosebud egg
Coronation egg
Lilies of the Valley egg
Cockerel egg
Fifteenth Anniversary egg
Bay Tree egg
Order of St. George egg

List of other Fabergé eggs
Kelch Hen egg
Kelch Chanticleer egg
Duchess of Marlborough egg
Resurrection egg
Scandinavian egg
Spring Flowers egg

See also
 List of museums in Saint Petersburg
 Fabergé Museum in Baden-Baden

References

 Faberge's New Home in Russia  - Video about the museum - WKYC-TV

External links

 Fabergé Museum - official website
 The Link of Times Cultural-Historical Foundation (archived from the original)

 
Art museums and galleries in Saint Petersburg
Decorative arts museums in Russia
Fabergé